Gordon Alexander Low (born 11 July 1940) is a former professional footballer, who played for Huddersfield Town, Bristol City, Stockport County, Crewe Alexandra and Selby Town.

References

1940 births
Living people
Scottish footballers
Footballers from Aberdeen
Association football defenders
English Football League players
Huddersfield Town A.F.C. players
Bristol City F.C. players
Stockport County F.C. players
Crewe Alexandra F.C. players
Selby Town F.C. players
Association football midfielders